"Fragile" is a song written and performed by English musician Sting from his second studio album ...Nothing Like the Sun. Released as a single the following year, it placed to number 70 on the UK Singles Chart. Sung additionally in both Spanish and Portuguese under the titles "Fragilidad" and "Fragil", it appeared twice more on his 1988 EP variant of the album, Nada como el sol. The Spanish version features as a b-side to "I'm So Happy I Can't Stop Crying".

The song is a tribute to Ben Linder, an American civil engineer who was killed by the Contras in 1987 while working on a hydroelectric project in Nicaragua.

"Fragile" was the opening song in Sting's ...All This Time concert, recorded on the evening of the September 11 attacks in 2001. Sting performed the song with cellist Yo Yo Ma during the opening ceremonies of the 2002 Winter Olympics in Salt Lake City, Utah.  The song appears in the 1995 Oscar-nominated documentary The Living Sea.

Sting also dedicated the song to both Ukraine and the women of Iran during his show in Oslo, Norway at 19 October 2022.

A version of the song with Julio Iglesias was included in Sting's Duets compilation album (2021).

Track listings

UK 7" Single
 "Fragile" – 
 "Frágil" (Portuguese) –

Bolivian 7" Single
 "Fragil" –
 "Si Estamos Juntos" –

UK CD Single/ UK 12" Single
 "Fragile" – 3:45
 "Frágil" – 3:50 
 "Frágilidad" – 3:52
 "Mariposa Libre" – 4:54

Spanish 7" Single
 "Fragile" – 3:54
 "Frágil" (Portuguese) – 3:50

European 7" Single
 "Fragile" – 3:54
 "Frágil" (Portuguese) – 3:50

German 12" Maxi Single/ European CD Maxi Single
 "Fragile" – 3:54
 "Up From The Skies" – 10:06
 "Someone To Watch Over Me" – 4:32

Uruguayan 7" Single
 "Fragile" (In Spanish) – 3:55
 "Conversation With A Dog" – 3:34

Canadian 7" Single/ US 7" Single/ Japanese 3" CD Single/ Japanese Promo 3" CD Single
 "Fragile" – 3:54
 "Fragilidad" (Spanish) – 3:52

Portuguese 7" Single
 "Fragile" – 3:54
 "Frágil" (Portuguese) – 3:52

US Promo 7" Single
 "Fragile" – 3:54
 "Fragile" – 3:54

French 7" Single/ French CD Single
 "Fragil" (Portugues) – 3:50
 "Mariposa Libre" – 4:54

Spanish 7" Single
 "Fragilidad" – 3:52
 "Fragil" (Portugues) – 3:50

Mexican 7" Promo Single
 "Fragilidad" – 3:52
 "Fragilidad" – 3:52

French 12" Promo Single
 "Fragil" (Portugues) – 3:50
 "Fragil" (Portugues) – 3:50

Charts

Weekly charts

Year-end charts

References

1987 songs
1988 singles
A&M Records singles
Macaronic songs
Music videos directed by Dominic Sena
Songs written by Sting (musician)
Sting (musician) songs